The Silver War Badge was issued in the United Kingdom and the British Empire to service personnel who had been honourably discharged due to wounds or sickness from military service in World War I.

History
The badge, sometimes known as the "Discharge Badge", the "Wound Badge" or "Services Rendered Badge", was first issued in September 1916, along with an official certificate of entitlement.  If a person served in an active war zone then a King's Certificate of Discharge stating that they "Served with honour" would accompany the badge.

The large sterling silver lapel badge was intended to be worn on civilian clothes. The decoration was introduced as an award of "King's silver" for having received wounds or injury during loyal war service to the Crown's authority. A secondary causation for its introduction was that a practice had developed in the early years of the war in the United Kingdom where some women took it upon themselves to confront and publicly embarrass men of fighting age they saw in public places who were not in military uniform, by ostentatiously presenting them with white feathers, as a suggestion of cowardice. As the war had developed substantial numbers of servicemen who had been discharged from His Majesty's Forces with wounds that rendered them unfit for war service, but which were not obvious from their outward appearance, found themselves being harassed in such a manner and the badge, to be worn on the right breast while in civilian dress, was a means of discouraging such incidents being directed at ex-forces' personnel. It was forbidden to wear the badge on a military uniform.

The badge bears the royal cypher "GRI" (for Georgius Rex Imperator; George, King and Emperor) and around the rim "For King and Empire - Services Rendered".

Each badge was uniquely numbered on the reverse. The War Office maintained a register recording which serviceman each one had been issued to in United Kingdom, and the governments of Canada, New Zealand, Australia, South Africa and Rhodesia maintained their own registers of issue (which were copied to the War Office in London to provide it with an Imperial master-record). Silver War Badges issued by the Empire's dominion nations had their identification numbers on the reverse prefixed with the first letter of the issuing nation: Australia with the letter 'A', Canada 'C', etc. In the United Kingdom the War Office made it known that it would not replace Silver War Badges if they were lost, however if one was handed into a police station then it would be returned to the War Office, which would seek to return it using its records to its recipient.

A similar award called the King's Badge was issued in World War II. Although each was issued with a certificate, unlike its World War I counterpart it was not individually numbered.

Silver War Badge - Medal Cards and Rolls
The "SWB List" when mentioned on a medal card refers to a list that is now kept in The National Archives. There are two different types of cards on which the List can be mentioned.
The SWB can be shown on a normal medal card index as in the adjacent picture.
It can also be recorded on a new medal card issued for the purpose, called a Silver War Badge Card.

If there is no Silver War Badge Card, then the details of the soldier's discharge can be found out by a visit to The National Archives at Kew. There should be a reference to a Silver War Badge Roll, for example in the picture above it says "SWB List TH/345" this refers to the roll in which the man is mentioned. On the Silver War Badge roll it should mention at the very least the number of the badge, the official reason and date of his discharge.

A silver war badge card can be accessed online via The National Archives. On the card it should mention the date of discharge, the cause and the number of the badge (in many ways just like a Silver War Badge Roll but online, and therefore easier to access)

Records for the Australian Imperial Force can be accessed via the Australian War Memorial.

King's Regulations For Discharge

There are 29 different ways in which someone could have been discharged under the King's Regulations. On a Silver War Badge Card, it could say KR (xxi) as it does on the example SWB card. This stands for King's Regulations, section 21. The different regulations are:
 (i)         References on enlistment being unsatisfactory.
 (ii)        Having been irregularly enlisted.
 (iii)       Not likely to become an efficient soldier.
 (iv)       Having been claimed as an apprentice.
 (v)        Having claimed it on payment of £10 within three months of his attestation.
 (vi)       Having made a mis-statement as to age on enlistment.
 (vii)      Having been claimed for wife desertion.
 (viii)     Having made a false answer on attestation.
 (ix)       Unfitted for the duties of the corps.
 (x)        Having been convicted by the civil power of_, or of an offence committed before enlistment.
 (xi)       For misconduct.
 (xii)      Having been sentenced to penal servitude.
 (xiii)     Having been sentenced to be discharged with ignominy.
 (xiv)     At his own request, on payment of _ under Article 1130 (i), Pay Warrant.
 (xv)      Free, after  years' service under Article 1130 (ii), Pay Warrant.
 (xvi)     No longer physically fit for war service.
 (xvii)    Surplus to military requirements (having suffered impairment since entry into the service).
 (xviii)   At his own request after 18 years' service (with a view to pension under the Pay Warrant).
 (xix)     For the benefit of the public service after 18 years' service (with a view to pension under the Pay Warrant).
 (xx)      Inefficiency after 18 years' service (with a view to pension under the Pay Warrant).
 (xxi)     The termination of his  period of engagement.
 (xxii)    With less than 21 years' service towards engagement, but with 21 or more years' service towards pension.
 (xxiii)   Having claimed discharge after three months' notice.
 (xxiv)   Having reached the age for discharge.
 (xxv)    His services being no longer required.
 (xxvi)   Surplus to military requirements (Not having suffered impairment since entry into the service).
 (xxvii)  At his own request after 21 (or more) years' service (with a view to pension under the Pay Warrant).
 (xxviii) After 21 (or more) years' qualifying service for pension, and with 5 (or more) years' service as warrant officer (with a view to pension under the Pay Warrant).
 (xxviv) On demobilization.

Issued numbers
Approximately 1,150,000 badges were issued, which had to be claimed and then approved, generally covered by §(xvi) above. The numbers on the back of the badge kept changing during the war. 
Between September 1916 and March 1918, they were issued with just a number and were better quality than most stampings. Around 335,000 of these were issued. 
Between March 1918 and September 1918, these were the second series. This took the number of badges issued up to 450,000.
Between September 1918 and December 1919, they had a 'B' prefix before the number. Around 450,000 of these were issued.
Between December 1919 and January 1920, they had a 'O' prefix, around 5,000 of these were issued.
Between January 1920 and March 1922, they went back to ordinary numbers again. Around 70,000 badges were issued.
After April 1918 there were several changes;
RAF men were issued with badges prefixed with 'RAF', over 10,000 badges were issued.
The Royal Navy had a separate prefix, which was 'RN', there were at least 43,000 badges issued. 
After this date it became possible for servicemen, civilians who served in the RAMC, female nurses, VADs, QMAAC staff, etc. to get awarded the silver war badge.
 Badges issued to South African Soldiers have the 'SA' prefix and to Canadians have a 'C' prefix

See also 

 Lists of abbreviations used on British Empire World War I medals

References

Notes

Resources

Search over 5 million campaign medal cards on The UK National Archives' website.
http://www.1914-1918.net
Links to NAA via AWM – Australian War Memorial with links to the National Archives of Australia, for service and formation specific details.

British campaign medals
United Kingdom in World War I
Wound decorations
Military awards and decorations of World War I